Exalphus vicinus is a species of beetle in the family Cerambycidae. It was described by Galileo and Martins in 2003.

References

Acanthoderini
Beetles described in 2003